Yevgeni Aleksandrovich Gorodov (born 13 December 1985) is a Russian former professional football player. He played as a goalkeeper.

Club career
On 5 August 2020, he returned to FC Krasnodar and signed a two-year contract. He left Krasnodar as his contract expired in May 2022.

Career statistics

Club

References

External links
 

1985 births
Sportspeople from Barnaul
Living people
Russian footballers
Association football goalkeepers
FC Dynamo Barnaul players
FC Tom Tomsk players
FC Chita players
FC Shinnik Yaroslavl players
FC Krasnodar players
FC Akhmat Grozny players
Russian Premier League players
Russian First League players
Russian Second League players